Belogushev Island is the mostly ice-covered island off the west coast of Renaud Island in Biscoe Islands, Antarctica extending 1.3 km in southeast-northwest direction and 850 m in southwest-northeast direction, and ending in Speerschneider Point on the northwest. Its surface area is 68 ha. The island was formed at the end of the first decade of 21st century as a result of the retreat of the ice cap of Renaud Island.

The feature is named after the Bulgarian geologist Vasil Belogushev for his support for the Bulgarian Antarctic programme.

Location
British mapping in 1960.

Maps
 Falkland Islands Dependencies (provisional issue for positioning of place names). Sheet 65 66. Scale 1:200000. Research Department, Foreign Office, 1960
 Antarctic Digital Database (ADD). Scale 1:250000 topographic map of Antarctica. Scientific Committee on Antarctic Research (SCAR). Since 1993, regularly upgraded and updated

See also
 List of Antarctic and subantarctic islands

Notes

References
 Bulgarian Antarctic Gazetteer. Antarctic Place-names Commission. (details in Bulgarian, basic data in English)

External links
 Belogushev Island. Adjusted Copernix satellite image

Islands of the Biscoe Islands
Bulgaria and the Antarctic